William Thomas Meehan (1889–1982) was an American Major League Baseball (MLB) pitcher. He played for the Philadelphia Athletics during the  season.

A single in his only at-bat left Meehan with a rare MLB career batting average of 1.000.

References

Major League Baseball pitchers
Philadelphia Athletics players
Trenton Tigers players
Wilkes-Barre Barons (baseball) players
Wilson Bugs players
Baseball players from Pennsylvania
1889 births
1982 deaths